Helminthoglypta sequoicola, the redwood shoulderband snail, is a North American species of air-breathing land snail. Two subspecies are recognized:

 Helminthoglypta sequoicola consors (S.S. Berry, 1938)
Previously called Helminthoglypta dupetithouarsi consors
 Helminthoglypta sequoicola sequoicola (J. G. Cooper, 1866)

References

Molluscs of the United States
Helminthoglypta
Gastropods described in 1866
Endemic fauna of California